Netherlands at the European Track Championships is an overview of the Dutch results at the European Track Championships. Since 2001 there have been "European Track Championships for under-23 and junior" riders and since 2010 "European Track Championships for elite" riders. Note that the under-23 and junior championships before 2010 also included omnium elite events.

European Track Championships (elite) 2010-current

Medalists 
This a list of medals won at the UEC European Track Championships for elite riders from 2010 to current.

Medals by year

European Track Championships (under-23 & junior) 2001-current 

Below is an overview of the Dutch results at the European Track Championships for under-23 and junior riders. Note that these championships also had a few elite events.

Medalists

Elite 
This a list of medals won at the European Track Championships for elite riders from 2001 to 2009 current.

Under-23 medalists

Junior medalists

Most successful Dutch competitors
updated after the 2013 European Track Championships (under-23 & junior)

Medals by year

See also

  Netherlands at the UCI Track Cycling World Championships
  Netherlands at the UCI Track Cycling World Cup Classics
  Netherlands at the European Road Championships
  Netherlands at the UCI Road World Championships

Netherlands at cycling events
Nations at the European Track Championships